Crematogaster brunnescens is a species of ant in tribe Crematogastrini. It was described by Motschoulsky in 1863.

References

brunnescens
Insects described in 1863